Mrinalini Dutta Mahavidyapith, established in 1964, is a general degree college in Birati, Kolkata. It offers undergraduate courses in arts, commerce and sciences.  It is affiliated to West Bengal State University.

Departments

Science

Anthropology
Chemistry
Physics
Mathematics 
Botany
Zoology
Computer Science

Arts

Bengali
English 
Sanskrit
Geography
History
Political Science
Education
Philosophy
Sociology
Journalism and Mass Communication

Accreditation
Mrinalini Dutta Mahavidyapith is recognized by the University Grants Commission (UGC). It was accredited by the National Assessment and Accreditation Council (NAAC), and awarded B++ grade, an accreditation that has since then expired.

See also
Education in India
List of colleges in West Bengal
Education in West Bengal

References

External links
Mrinalini Dutta Mahavidyapith

Educational institutions established in 1964
Colleges affiliated to West Bengal State University
Universities and colleges in North 24 Parganas district
1964 establishments in West Bengal